Bill Evans (1929–1980) was a jazz pianist.

Bill Evans may also refer to:

Other musicians
Bill Evans (saxophonist) (born 1958), jazz saxophonist
Bill Evans (bluegrass) (born 1956), banjo player, author, and teacher
Yusef Lateef, known as Bill Evans before converting to Islam, jazz saxophonist

Sports
Bill Evans (1910s pitcher) (1893–1946), played for the Pirates
Bill Evans (1940s pitcher) (1919–1983), played for the Red Sox and White Sox
Bill Evans (outfielder) (1899–1986)
Bill Evans (rugby union) (1857–1935), Welsh rugby union international
Billy Evans (basketball, born 1932) (born 1932), American member of the 1956 gold medal-winning Olympic team
Bill Evans (basketball coach) (born 1948), college men's basketball coach
Bill Evans (dancer), American dancer and choreographer
Bill Evans (Canadian football) in 1975 CFL Draft
Bill Evans (jockey) on List of Melbourne Cup winners
Bill Evans (motorsport) in 1968 Hardie-Ferodo 500
Bill Evans (racing driver) in 1979 Australian Touring Car Championship
Bill Evans (speedway rider), see Grasstrack

Others
Bill Evans (meteorologist) (born 1960), Eyewitness News This Morning
Morgan "Bill" Evans (1910–2002), Disney horticulturist
William B. Evans, Commissioner, Boston Police Department
Bill Evans, a police officer killed in the 2010 West Memphis police shootings
Bill Evans (album), a 1990 album by Paul Motian

See also
Billy Evans (disambiguation)
William Evans (disambiguation)
 List of people with surname Evans